A cavalcade is a horseback procession, parade, or mass trail ride.

Cavalcade may also refer to:

Arts, entertainment, and media

Cavalcade (play), a play by Noël Coward
Cavalcade (1933 film), Academy Award-winning film adaptation of the play
Cavalcade (1960 film), Argentine film
Cavalcade (magazine), defunct British news magazine

Music
Cavalcade (Black Midi album), a 2021 album by rock band Black Midi
Cavalcade (Catamenia album), a 2010 album by metal band Catamenia
Cavalcade (The Flatliners album), a 2010 album by The Flatliners
Cavalcade (The Slow Readers Club album), a 2015 album by the Slow Readers Club

Other uses
Cavalcade (horse) (1931–1940), thoroughbred horse
Cavalcade (METRORail station), rapid transit station in Houston, Texas, United States
Suzuki GV1400 Cavalcade, a Suzuki luxury touring motorcycle available from 1985 to 1988 in North America

See also